Fera Ferida (English: The Injured Beast) is a Brazilian telenovela produced and broadcast by TV Globo. It premiered on 15 November 1993, replacing Renascer and ended on 16 July 1994, with a total of 210 episodes. It's the forty eighth "novela das oito" to be aired on the timeslot. It is created by Aguinaldo Silva, Ricardo Linhares, Ana Maria Moretzsohn and directed by Dennis Carvalho with Marcos Paulo.

Cast

References

External links 
 

1993 telenovelas
Brazilian telenovelas
TV Globo telenovelas
1993 Brazilian television series debuts
1994 Brazilian television series endings
Portuguese-language telenovelas
Television series about revenge
Fiction about alchemy